Baníkov is a mountain in the Western Tatras mountain range, Slovakia. It reaches a height of 2,178 meters.

The name of the mountain refers to iron ore mining activities from the 18th century. There were attempts to find iron ore under the mountain slopes but ended with no success. Baník means 'miner' in Slovak.

References 

Western Tatras
Mountains of Slovakia
Mountains of the Western Carpathians